Emil Zuckerkandl (1 September 1849 in Győr, Hungary – 28 May 1910 in Vienna, Austria) was a Hungarian anatomist.

Biography 
Zuckerkandl was born  in Győr on 1 September 1849, to a Jewish family. He had two brothers: the industrialist Victor Zuckerkandl, and the urologist Otto Zuckerkandl (1861–1921).

He was educated at the University of Vienna (MD, 1874) and was an admiring student of Josef Hyrtl, and an anatomical assistant to Karl von Rokitansky (1804–1878) and Karl Langer (1819–1887). In 1875, he became privatdozent of anatomy at the University of Utrecht, and he was appointed assistant professor at the University of Vienna in 1879, being made professor at Graz in 1882. Beginning in 1888, he was a professor of descriptive and topographical anatomy at the University of Vienna.

He conducted research in almost all fields of morphology, making contributions to the normal and pathological anatomy of the nasal cavity, the anatomy of the facial skeleton, blood vessels, the brain, chromaffin system, et al.

He was married to the Galician-Austrian writer, journalist and critic Berta Szeps. The couple's house was a popular meeting place for the avant-garde in arts and science; their guests including sculptor Auguste Rodin (1840–1917), painter Gustav Klimt (1862–1918), architect Otto Wagner (1841–1918), writer Hermann Bahr (1863–1934), playwright Arthur Schnitzler (1862–1931), and composer Gustav Mahler (1860–1911).

Writings 
Zuckerkandl contributed many monographs to medical journals, among them:
 
 "Zur Morphologie des Gesichtschädels" (Stuttgart, 1877)
 "Über eine Bisher noch Nicht Beschriebene Drüse der Regio Suprahyoidea" (Stuttgart, 1879)
 "Über das Riechcentrum" (Stuttgart, 1887) 
 "Normale und Pathologische Anatomie der Nasenhöhle und Ihrer Pneumatischen Anhänge" (Vienna, 1892).
 "Atlas der topographischen Anatomie", five volumes. Vienna and Leipzig, 1900–1904. 
 "Atlas der descriptiven anatomie des Menschen", Vienna, Leipzig, W. Braumüller, 1902. Initially published by Carl Heitzmann (1836–1896) in 1870 as Die descriptive und topographische Anatomie des Menschen. 
 "Atlas und Grundriss der chirurgischen Operationslehre" fifth edition, Munich, 1915. xix + 556 pages.

Eponyms 
 Zuckerkandl's bodies (1901)
 Zuckerkandl's convolution
 Zuckerkandl's dehiscence
 Zuckerkandl's fascia (1883)
 Zuckerkandl's tubercle (1902)
 Suprapleural membrane of Zuckerkandl and Sebileau

Awards 
 1898: Appointment as full member of the Austrian Academy of Sciences
 1914: Unveiling of a monument at the Anatomical Institute (28 May)
 1924: Unveiling of a statue by Anton Hanak in the arcaded courtyard of the University of Vienna
 1925: Designation of Zuckerkandlgasse in Vienna-Pötzleinsdorf (1925–1938 and from 1947 onward)

References

Bibliography 
Jewish Encyclopedia Bibliography : Pagel, J. L., Biog. Lex.

1849 births
1910 deaths
Burials at Döbling Cemetery
People from Győr
Hungarian Jews
Jewish physicians
Hungarian anatomists
Jewish Hungarian scientists
Members of the Austrian Academy of Sciences